Baby Girl is the first album released by May J. under the label Sony Music Japan.
The album charted on the weekly Oricon chart on the #50 place.

Track listing

CD track list 
 "Do tha' Do tha'"
 "My Girls"
 "Destination" (D.O.I.Hip Hop Mix) (feat. Taro Soul)
 "Dear..."
 "Why Why Why..."
 "Baila Conmigo"
 "Here We Go" (feat. Verbal (M-Flo))
 "You"
 "Jealous Girl"
 "Baby Eyes" (DJ Watari Remix) (feat. Ken-U)
 "Feel the Sunshine"
 "Don't Worry Dear My Boy"
 "My Way、Your Way"
 "Love Blossom" (F.P.M.Remix)

DVD track list 
 "Dear... PV"
 "Do tha' Do tha' CM"
 "Do tha' Do tha' PV"
 "Here We Go feat. Verbal (M-Flo) PV"
 "My Girls PV"

Charts

Oricon Sales Chart (Japan)

References

2007 debut albums